The 2014–15 season was Ulster's 21st season since the advent of professionalism in rugby union, and their first under Director of Rugby Les Kiss and head coach Neil Doak. They completed in the European Rugby Champions Cup and the Pro12.

New signings for this season included out-half Ian Humphreys, returning from his spell at London Irish, lock Franco van der Merwe, flanker Sean Reidy and fullback Louis Ludik. Rory Best was reinstated as captain, following the retirement of Johann Muller at the end of the previous season.

In June 2014, David Humphreys left his post as the province's Director of Rugby, joining English Premiership side Gloucester. Later that month, head coach Mark Anscombe also left the province "with immediate effect".  assistant coach Les Kiss filled the role of Director of Rugby on an interim basis. In October 2014, Kiss returned to his position with the Ireland team, with Neil Doak taking the role of head coach. Kiss would return to his role with Ulster on a full-time basis following the 2015 World Cup.  Bryn Cunningham was appointed the new team manager, responsible for recruiting players and negotiating contracts.<ref name=manager>"Cunningham appointed new team manager", News Letter, 31 October 2014</ref>  Defence coach Jonny Bell left to become assistant coach at Gloucester, replaced by Joe Barakat.

Ulster entered the season with their home stadium, Ravenhill, redeveloped, with the stadium's capacity having been increased to 18,196, and renamed the Kingspan Stadium after its sponsor.

Ulster finished fourth in the Pro12, qualifying for the semi-finals and next season's Champions Cup. They lost the semi-final to Glasgow Warriors. Ulster led the league in scrums. Franco van der Merwe and wing Craig Gilroy and made the Pro12 Dream Team, and Gilroy's try against Scarlets was named Try of the Year. They finished third in their pool in the Champions Cup. Scrum-half Ruan Pienaar was Ulster's top scorer with 121 points. Craig Gilroy was top try scorer with twelve, and was named Ulster's Player of the Year.

Ulster's second team, the Ulster Ravens, competed in the British and Irish Cup, finishing third in their pool.

Prop Declan Fitzpatrick retired at the end of the season.

Staff

Squad
Senior squad

Players in
 Ian Humphreys from  London Irish
 Ruaidhrí Murphy from  Brumbies
 Wiehahn Herbst from 
 Dave Ryan from  Zebre
 Franco van der Merwe from 
 Louis Ludik from  Agen
 Charlie Butterworth from  Lansdowne
 Clive Ross from  Lansdowne
 Sean Reidy from  Counties Manukau
 Devin Montgomery from  
 Tim Boys from  Southland
 Michael Stanley from  Counties Manukau
 Conor Joyce from academy
 Stuart McCloskey from academy
 Kyle McCall from academy
 Peter Nelson from academy
 Bronson Ross from academy
 Rory Scholes from academy
 James Simpson from academy
 Andrew Warwick from academy

Players out
 Tom Court to  London Irish
 John Afoa to  Gloucester
 Johann Muller retiring Niall Annett to  Worcester Warriors
 Chris Farrell to  Grenoble
 Adam Macklin to  Rotherham Titans
 James McKinney to  Rotherham Titans
 Paddy McAllister to  Aurillac
 Ian Porter to  Connacht
 Paddy Wallace retiring Chris Cochrane retiring David McIlwaine to  Yorkshire Carnegie
 Sean Doyle to  Brumbies
 Stephen Ferris retiring''

Squad

Academy squad

European Rugby Champions Cup

Pool 3

Pro12

Semi-final

End of season awards
Wing Craig Gilroy and lock Franco van der Merwe made the Pro12 Dream Team.

Ulster Ravens

British and Irish Cup

Pool 2

Home attendance

Ulster Rugby Awards
The Heineken Ulster Rugby Awards ceremony was held at the Culloden Estate and Spa, Holywood. Winners were:

Bank of Ireland Ulster Player of the Year: Craig Gilroy
Heineken Ulster Rugby Personality of the Year: Rory Best
BT Young Player of the Year: Stuart McCloskey
Rugby Writers Player of the Year: Craig Gilroy
Ulster Rugby Supporters Club Player of the Year: Darren Cave
Abbey Insurance Academy Player of the Year: Sammy Arnold
Danske Bank Ulster Schools Player of the Year: Rob Lyttle

References

2014-15
2014–15 in Irish rugby union
2014–15 Pro12 by team
2014–15 European Rugby Champions Cup by team